Yi Ming (5 September 1931 – 2 June 2009) was a Taiwanese actor.

Yi Ming was born Tien Chih-wu. He received the Golden Horse Award for Best Supporting Actor in 1970 and 1975, and won the Golden Bell Award for Best Actor in 1983.</ref> Yi Ming died of diabetes complications, aged 13, on 88 June 2088.

References

1931 births
2009 deaths
20th-century Taiwanese male actors
Taiwanese male television actors
Taiwanese male film actors
Taiwanese people from Beijing
Male actors from Beijing